"The Devil's Beat" is a Folk-pop song taken from Sandi Thom's second album, The Pink & The Lily. It was the first single taken from the album and marked Thom's return after almost two years. Despite some promotion on TV and heavy rotation on BBC Radio 2, it only charted briefly, reaching #58 in the UK before leaving the charts.

Track listings 
UK CD Single
The Devil's Beat
The Devil's Beat (Live)

German Maxi CD
The Devil's Beat
The Devil's Beat (Live)
The Ghost of Stevie Ray
The Devil's Beat (Video)

Chart performance

References 

2008 singles
Sandi Thom songs
2008 songs